Zabul is one of the 34 provinces of Afghanistan, located in the south of the country. It has a population of 249,000. Zabul became an independent province from neighbouring Kandahar in 1963. Historically, it was part of the Zabulistan region. Qalat serves as the capital of the province. The major ethnic group are Pashtuns. Primary occupations within Zabul are agriculture and animal husbandry.

Geography

Zabul borders Oruzgan in the north, Kandahar in the west and in the south, Ghazni and Paktika in the east. It borders Pakistan in the east.

The province covers an area of 17293 km2. Two-fifths of the province is mountainous or semi mountainous terrain (41%) while more than one quarter of the area is made up of flat land (28%).

The primary ecoregion of the province is the central Afghan mountains xeric woodlands. Common vegetation is listed as dry shrub-land and pistachio. The high mountains of the northern portion of the province are in the Ghor-Hazarajat alpine meadow ecoregion, which is characterized by meadows, willows, and sea buckthorn.

Transportation 

In 2006, the province's first airstrip was opened near Qalat, to be operated by the Afghan National Army, but also for use by commercial aviation.  Twice weekly service was scheduled by PRT Air between Qalat and Kabul.  The airstrip is not paved. The ANA Chief in Zabul is Major General Jamaluddin Sayed

Zabul Province is bisected by Highway 1 and travelers going between Kandahar and Kabul via road typically pass through the province.

On 4 September 2016, at least 38 people were killed and 28 were injured during the September 2016 Afghanistan road crash.

Healthcare

The percentage of households with clean drinking water increased from 0% in 2005 to 32% in 2011.
The percentage of births attended to by a skilled birth attendant increased from 1% in 2005 to 5% in 2011.

Education

The overall literacy rate (6+ years of age) increased from 1% in 2005 to 19% in 2011. 
The overall net enrollment rate (6–13 years of age) fell from 31.3% in 2005 to 5% in 2011.

Demographics 

As of 2021, the total population of the province is about 850,000, which is mostly a rural tribal society. According to the Naval Postgraduate School, the population is primarily Pashtun, sprinkled throughout around 2,500 remote villages. Major tribal groups include the Tokhi and Hotaki Ghilji and the Noorzai and Panjpai Durrani.

Pashto is the dominant language in the area. The people of Zabul are overwhelmingly Sunni Muslim. Primary occupations within Zabul are agriculture and animal husbandry.

60.8% of the population lived below the national poverty line, one of the highest figures of all of Afghanistan's provinces.

Zabul is by many indications one of Afghanistan's most conservative provinces.

Districts

Sports

The province is represented in Afghan domestic cricket by the Zabul Province cricket team.

Gallery

Notable people 
 Alauddin Ghilji
 Mullah Omar
 Mullah Yaqoob Akhund
 Rustam-I-Pahlavan
 Jalauddin Ghilji
 Sohrab
 Sām
 Zal
 Tegin Shah

See also 
 Provinces of Afghanistan
 Zabulistan
 Zabol
 Abu Ali Lawik

References

External links

 
Provinces of Afghanistan
Wars involving the Taliban
States and territories established in 1963
Provinces of the Islamic Republic of Afghanistan